Stephen David Hassenfeld (January 19, 1942 – June 25, 1989) was an American businessman best known for being the chairman and chief executive officer of Hasbro from 1980 until 1989.  During his tenure, Hassenfeld restored the reputation of Hasbro and surpassed Mattel as the world's largest toy manufacturer.

History and early life
Stephen was born in Rhode Island to Sylvia Grace (née Kay) and Merrill Hassenfeld. He was the oldest of three siblings, the others being his sister Ellie and the youngest child, Alan.  They lived in Providence's east side.  He attended Moses Brown School where he was well known as a skilled debater.

Accomplishments
Stephen's grandfather, Henry Hassenfeld, was a Jewish immigrant from Poland who, with his brother Helal, founded a textile company that sold remnants called Hassenfeld Brothers.  The brothers would move on to sell pencil boxes, school supplies, and later, toys.  After the success of Mr. Potato Head and G.I. Joe the Hassenfeld Brothers would create Hasbro Industries in 1968, and begin to list on the NYSE.

In 1980, Stephen's father Merrill died, and Stephen took over control of Hasbro.  From 1980 to 1986, Stephen Hassenfeld increased Hasbro's profitability by 85% annually. Only two Fortune 500 companies have achieved such a high rate of growth in profitability. Forbes magazine rated Hasbro number one in a thousand-corporation survey of increased value during the first half of the 1980s, well ahead of other successful companies such as Wal-Mart and Berkshire Hathaway.

In 1983, Hassenfeld established the Hasbro Charitable Trust, and in 1984, he created Hasbro Children's Foundation.  The two charities help to improve the lives of children and their families throughout the world by providing  management of grant donations in operating areas, product donation, matching gifts to higher education, special community projects, and volunteering.  Also, in 1990, the Stephen D. Hassenfeld Children's Center for Cancer and Blood Disorders was created.  The Children's Center is affiliated with NYU Langone Health, and under its current director, Dr. Elizabeth Raetz has been making remarkable strides in alleviating the worst of children's suffering.

Legacy
Stephen D. Hassenfeld died of pneumonia and cardiac arrest in 1989 at the age of 47 after quietly and privately battling AIDS since early 1987, and is buried next to his father in Lincoln Park Cemetery in Warwick, Rhode Island. In 1991 he was posthumously inducted into the Toy Industry Hall of Fame.  At the time of Hassenfeld's death Hasbro was a company with annual net revenues of more than $1.3 billion.

Awards and honors
Honorary doctorate degrees from Rhode Island College, Bryant College, Providence College and Roger Williams College
Golden Plate Award of the American Academy of Achievement, 1987 
Toy Industry Hall of Fame, 1991
National Humanitarian Award of the Rhode Island Council of the National Jewish Hospital 
Humanitarian of the Year Award from the Rhode Island Big Brothers Association
International Licensing Industry Merchandisers’ Association Hall of Fame, 2010

References

 G. Wayne Miller, author of Toy Wars
 1 Toy Wars at the Library of Congress 
 2 Toy Wars at the Library of Congress 
 Hasbro history

1942 births
1989 deaths
Deaths from pneumonia in the United States
American chief executives of manufacturing companies
20th-century American Jews
20th-century American businesspeople
Moses Brown School alumni